"Papercut" is a song by American rock band Linkin Park. It was released as the third international single from their debut album Hybrid Theory (2000) and appears as the opening track on the record. The song reached number 14 on the UK Singles Chart in 2001 and was in the chart for 6 weeks. It also reached number 32 on the Modern Rock Tracks Chart in 2002. The song was certified Gold by the Recording Industry Association of America in 2017, for digital sales of 500,000 units.

Background
Lead singer Chester Bennington stated that "Papercut" was one of his favorite Linkin Park songs. In live performances, the line "something in here's not right today" is changed to "something inside's not right today". Also, Bennington screamed parts of the verses during live performances. It was also included in the soundtrack of the 2001 film The One.

On Linkin Park's remix album Reanimation (2002), there is a remix of this song, titled "Ppr:Kut", which was remixed by Cheapshot. Elements from the song were used in the song "Sold My Soul to Yo Mama", which appears on the Linkin Park Underground 4.0 and Songs from the Underground. Furthermore, the mashup EP Collision Course (2004) contains a mix of this song and Jay-Z's "Big Pimpin'". In 2005, the song was mashed-up with David Banner's "Like a Pimp (Remix)" for the mixtape hosted by Mike Shinoda (the band's rapper and lead vocalist), Rock Phenomenon, creating the song David Banner vs. Linkin Park.

On the band's previous single, "Crawling", a live performance on the song was included as the single's B-side.

Music video

The music video shows the band in a seemingly haunted house. They are playing the song in a room with little light with a rather spooky picture sampled from the cover artwork of the Xero demo tape. This was painted by Mike Shinoda the night before the video was shot. To the right of their room is a dark kitchen that sports a bound and writhing figure (likely the paranoid individual referenced in the song); to the left of their room is what appears to be a laboratory with a strange creature inside. It moves extremely fast and in an erratic manner.

Later in the song, the creature releases dragonflies (probably referring to the wings of a Hybrid Theory Soldier), while the baby picture and regions of the left wall bulge. Drummer Rob Bourdon's eyes appear melted as well (using special effects). Also, there is a statue of a bird which spins its head all the way around, and at one point, Shinoda's fingers stretch. There are parts of the song during which Shinoda is out of sync with the music, and at one point not even moving his mouth while he is speaking. In the video, the first member of the band to take notice of the strange goings-on is Bourdon (probably because he's the only one not playing an instrument), although bassist Dave "Phoenix" Farrell and vocalist Chester Bennington also start to notice the dragonflies and the bulgings on the wall towards the end of the video.

The lyrics of the song appear scribbled along the walls in the dark rooms. Even though the song features heavy distorted electric guitars, Brad Delson plays acoustic guitar and Phoenix plays acoustic bass in the video. The effects and imagery of the music video bring to the audience a sense of irritation and certain paranoia, which is what the song is about. At some point in the middle of the video, around 2:03, a strange blue figure runs past the band. Also note that at the end after the screen flashes black once, the band is gone, but their instruments are left where the band members were.

The music video was co-directed by Nathan "Karma" Cox and LP's turntablist Joseph Hahn (who also directed the videos for "Pts.OF.Athrty" and "In the End"). It was not released for the US.

As of February 2023, the music video for "Papercut" has over 240 million views on YouTube.

Chart performance
"Papercut" was the fourth single released from Hybrid Theory in the U.S, and only charted on the Modern Rock Tracks chart, where it peaked at number 32, although it stayed on the chart for 18 weeks. The song peaked at number 14 on the UK singles Chart and topped the UK Rock Charts for four non-consecutive weeks.

Track listing

Personnel
 Mike Shinoda – rapping,  sampler
 Chester Bennington – vocals
 Brad Delson – guitars
 Joe Hahn – turntables, samplers
 Rob Bourdon – drums
 Ian Hornbeck – bass

Charts

Weekly charts

Certifications

Release history

References

External links
 "Papercut" lyrics at linkinpark.com

2000 songs
2001 singles
Linkin Park songs
Songs written by Mike Shinoda
Warner Records singles

lt:Hybrid Theory#Papercut